Continental Resources, Inc. is a petroleum and natural gas exploration and production company headquartered in Oklahoma City. The company was founded by Harold Hamm in 1967 at the age of 21 as Shelly Dean Oil Company, originally named for Hamm's two daughters. In 1990, Shelly Dean re-branded itself as Continental Resources. It primarily used hydraulic fracturing and directional drilling to produce from low permeability formations.

The company's assets are primarily in the Bakken formation in North Dakota and Montana, the STACK and SCOOP plays in Oklahoma, and the Permian Basin.

It is ranked 818th on the Fortune 500.

History
In 1967, Harold Hamm founded Shelly Dean Oil Co., Continental's predecessor.

In 1990, the company was renamed Continental Resources.

In 1995, the company discovered what was later described as the Cedar Hills Field in North Dakota, the 7th largest onshore field in the lower 48 United States ranked by liquid proved reserves, and was the first to develop it exclusively through precision horizontal drilling.

In 2003, the company drilled its first wells in the Bakken formation.

In 2004, the company completed the Robert Heuer 1-17R in Divide County, the 1st commercially successful well in the North Dakota Bakken to be both horizontally drilled and completed using hydraulic fracturing.

In 2007, the company became a public company via an initial public offering in which Harold Hamm sold approximately $300 million worth of his shares.

In 2008, the company was the first to complete a horizontal well in the Three Forks zone.

In 2010, Continental introduced the ECO-Pad® drilling technique, which involves drilling 4 wells from 1 pad. This reduced the cost of drilling and increased production output.

In 2012, the company moved its headquarters from Enid, Oklahoma to Oklahoma City.

In 2016, the company sold assets in North Dakota and Montana for $222 million.

In 2017, the company sold 26,000 acres in the Arkoma Basin for $68 million.

In 2021, the company acquired 92,000 net leasehold acres and 50,000 net royalty acres in the Permian Basin from Pioneer Natural Resources for $3.25 billion.

References

External links

1967 establishments in Oklahoma
Companies based in Oklahoma City
Companies formerly listed on the New York Stock Exchange
Energy companies established in 1967
Natural gas companies of the United States
Non-renewable resource companies established in 1967
Oil companies of the United States
Petroleum in Oklahoma